Bemposta may refer to:

Bemposta (Abrantes), a parish in the municipality of Abrantes, Portugal
Bemposta Palace, a palace in Lisbon
Bemposta (Penamacor), a parish in the municipality of Penamacor, Portugal
Bemposta (Mogadouro), a parish in the municipality of Mogadouro, Portugal